This is a list of people who have served as Lord Lieutenant of Banffshire, Scotland.

James Duff, 2nd Earl Fife 17 March 1794 – 24 January 1809
In commission 1809–1813 
Sir George Abercromby, 4th Baronet
Francis Garden Campbell
Stewart Souler
James Duff, 4th Earl Fife 8 June 1813 – 1856
James Duff, 5th Earl Fife 17 March 1856 – 7 August 1879
Charles Henry Gordon-Lennox, 6th Duke of Richmond 22 August 1879 – 27 September 1903 
Charles Henry Gordon-Lennox, 7th Duke of Richmond 16 November 1903 – 18 January 1928
Sir John Ritchie Findlay, 1st Baronet 11 April 1928 – 13 April 1930
James Archibald 19 July 1930 – 8 September 1946
Sir George Abercromby, 8th Baronet 21 December 1946 – 9 September 1964
Col. Thomas Robert Gordon-Duff 15 January 1965 – 1987 † 
James Alexander Strachan McPherson 11 December 1987 – 2002 † 
Clare Nancy Russell 19 February 2003 – 4 August 2019 
Christopher Andrew Crawford Simpson 4 August 2019 – current ‡ 

† Known as Lord-Lieutenant of the County of Banff in Grampian Region 1975–1996.

‡ Website of the Lieutenancy of Banffshire

Deputy Lieutenants
Deputy Lieutenants traditionally supported the Lord-Lieutenant. There could be several deputy lieutenants at any time, depending on the population of the county. Their appointment did not terminate with the changing of the Lord-Lieutenant, but they often retired at age 75. 

George Stephen, 1st Baron Mount Stephen 29 April 1901 
Jim Walker CBE and Andrew Simpson until 14 January 2020 
Frances McKay and Patricia Lawson from 14 January 2020 
Alan McIntosh BEM
Charles Milne

Notes and references 

Aberdeenshire
Moray
Banffshire
 
Banffshire